Athanata Rebetika (Greek: Αθάνατα Ρεμπέτικα) is the name of a studio album by popular Greek singer Marinella. It was released on 24 November 1972 by PolyGram Records in Greece. All songs were arranged and conducted by Mimis Plessas. The album was issued in mono and stereo. The stereo version of this album was released on CD in June 1994 by PolyGram, with four bonus tracks.

Track listing 

Side One.
 "Thessaloniki mou" (Θεσσαλονίκη μου; My Thessaloniki) – (Manolis Chiotis - Christos Kolokotronis) – 2:51
 "Vathia sti thalassa tha peso" (Βαθιά στη θάλασσα θα πέσω; I will jump into the deep sea) – (Giorgos Zambetas - Charalampos Vasiliadis) – 3:17
 "Derbenterissa" (Ντερμπεντέρισσα; Straight talking woman) – (Vassilis Tsitsanis - Nikos Routsos) – 3:01
 A live version of this song appears on Mia Vradia Me Tin Marinella No. 2.
 "De me stefanonese" (Δε με στεφανώνεσαι; You don't marry me) – (Vassilis Tsitsanis) – 2:05
 A live version of this song appears on Mia Vradia Me Tin Marinella No. 2.
 "Ena piato adio" (Ένα πιάτο άδειο; An empty dish) – (Theodoros Derveniotis - Kostas Virvos) – 2:55
 "Synnefies" (Συννεφιές; Cloudy) – (Giorgos Mitsakis) – 2:52
Side Two.
 "To vouno" (Το βουνό; The mountain) – (Loukas Daralas - Evaggelos Prekas) – 3:39
 "Esy ise i etia pou ypofero" (Εσύ είσαι η αιτία που υποφέρω; You're the cause of my suffering) – (Manolis Chiotis) – 2:13
 "Kapia mana anastenazi" (Κάποια μάνα αναστενάζει; Some mother is sighing) – (Vassilis Tsitsanis - Lambros Mpakalis) – 3:21
 "Zaira" (Ζαΐρα; Zaira) – (Vassilis Tsitsanis - Kostas Virvos) – 3:10
 "Sa magemeno to mialo mou" (Σα μαγεμένο το μυαλό μου; As if my mind is enchanted) – (Dimitris "Bayianteras" Gogos) – 4:08
 A live version of this song appears on I Marinella Tragouda Ke Thimate.
 "Ta matia p' agapo" (Τα μάτια π' αγαπώ; The eyes I love) – (Vassilis Tsitsanis) – 2:27

Bonus tracks on the CD re-issue.
 "I proti agapi sou ime ego" (Η πρώτη αγάπη σου είμαι εγώ; I am your first love) – (Giorgos Mitsakis) – 3:02
 This song had been recorded in 1985 and released on Ta Laika Tis Nichtas (Athens by night). The first studio version had been released as a single in 1957, by Stelios Kazantzidis and Marinella.
 "Esena den sou axize agapi" (Εσένα δεν σου άξιζε αγάπη; You didn't deserve love) – (Giannis Karampesinis) – 3:10
 This song had been recorded in 1985 and released on Ta Laika Tis Nichtas (Athens by night).
 "Lili, i skandaliara" (Λιλή, η σκανταλιάρα; Scandalous Lily) – (Panagiotis Toundas) – 2:56
 This song had been recorded in 1985 and released on Ta Laika Tis Nichtas (Athens by night). A live version appears on Me Varka To Tragoudi.
 "Mes stin polli skotoura mou" (Μες στην πολλή σκοτούρα μου; In the deep trouble I am in) – (Vassilis Tsitsanis - Stratos Pagioumtzis) – 3:26
 This song had been recorded in 1985 and released on Ta Laika Tis Nichtas (Athens by night).

Personnel 
 Marinella - vocals, background vocals
 Marios Kostoglou - background vocals on tracks 1, 4, 8, 10 and 12
 Mimis Plessas - arranger, conductor
 Philippos Papatheodorou - producer
 Yiannis Smyrneos - recording engineer
 Alinta Mavrogeni - photographer
 Effie Stergiopoulou - artwork

References

1972 albums
Marinella albums
Greek-language albums
Universal Music Greece albums